There are 14 open road tunnels in Iceland in the Icelandic road system. Additionally, there is one road tunnel only for use by a silicon plant in Húsavík. Tunnels in Iceland are usually built under mountains to prevent winter isolation of remote communities which would otherwise have to depend on high roads that are often closed due to snow, to shorten distance between communities, and to increase road safety by bypassing dangerous stretches of road.

Tunneling is a relatively recent trend in Icelandic road infrastructure. It started off slowly and was at first only used in extreme circumstances, such as under Arnardalshamar in 1948. The first tunnel of significant length was opened in 1967 and provided the northern town of Siglufjörður with its first year-round road link to the rest of the country. The second tunnel, opened in 1977, replaced a difficult road over the mountain pass Oddsskarð in eastern Iceland, which could only be used during the short summer and was the only road link to the town of Neskaupstaður. The third tunnel was opened in 1992 and replaced a very hazardous mountainside road to the northern town of Ólafsfjörður. All three of these tunnels were built as a single lane with widenings at regular intervals, where vehicles coming from opposite directions can pass. As improved engineering methods made tunneling cheaper and Iceland became more prosperous in the 1990s, tunnels became viable options for places where they had not been considered before. In 1996 the Vestfjarðagöng tunnel opened in the Westfjords region; it ended the winter isolation of three villages by linking them to the town of Ísafjörður. This tunnel was the last one built with single-lane segments.

In 1998 the sub-sea Hvalfjörður Tunnel opened, reducing the distance from Reykjavík to the town of Akranes by 60 kilometers and consequently abolishing the ferry service between the two. The distance between Reykjavík and other destinations on the north side of the fjord Hvalfjörður was reduced by 45 kilometers. It was the first tunnel in Iceland to have been financed, built and operated by a private entity and, as such, it was also the first tunnel where tolls were charged. The original plan assumed it would take 20 years (until 2018) to pay back the cost of building the tunnel and that the tunnel. As per the original plan, the tunnel was turned over to the state on the 30th of September 2018 when the Icelandic Road Administration took over its operation. Traffic has proved to be significantly higher than originally projected. So high in fact, that the operator of the tunnel has suggested building a new tunnel alongside the current one, since traffic is reaching the threshold mandated by European regulation (10,000 vehicles daily) where traffic in opposing directions is meant to be separated.

Nine tunnels have opened since the beginning of the 21st century. In the 2010s, Bolungarvíkurgöng on route 61 in Westfjords between Hnifsdalur and Bolungarvik, replacing the road which was often affected by rockfalls and avalanches, and Héðinsfjarðargöng I and II on route 76 in Northeastern Region between the towns Ólafsfjörður and Siglufjörður, reducing the distance between the towns to 15 km.

Tunnels

aSingle lane with widenings for passing.
bThere is a third lane for passing on the uphill side at the north end of the tunnel.
*Under construction.
**In planning.

See also
List of tunnels by location
Transport in Iceland
Vegagerðin

References

 
Iceland
Tunnels
Tunnels